Monika Matysová (born 29 December 1981) is a Slovak football defender, currently playing for Union Nové Zámky in the Slovak Women's First League.

She has served as captain of the Slovakian national team.

References

1981 births
Living people
Slovak women's footballers
Expatriate women's footballers in Austria
Expatriate women's footballers in the Czech Republic
Sportspeople from Nitra
Slovak expatriate sportspeople in Austria
Women's association football forwards
Slovak expatriate sportspeople in the Czech Republic
FSK St. Pölten-Spratzern players
SV Horn players
SK Slavia Praha (women) players
AC Sparta Praha (women) players
Slovakia women's international footballers
ÖFB-Frauenliga players
Czech Women's First League players
FK Union Nové Zámky players